Qingdao No.1 International School of Shandong Province (QISS) is overseen by Qingdao Local Bureau of Education and provides education for Chinese children with foreign passports. Approximately 200 students attend classes from Pre-K to 12th grade. QISS is an ACAMIS member school and accredited by Western Association of Schools and Colleges Board (WASC). The School is located in Laoshan district Qingdao, China

Curriculum 

The QISS curriculum is designed to follow the U.S. Common Core Standards and the standards set by the College Board.
The school offers AP classes and is a PSAT and SAT designated testing site.

The following AP Courses are taught at QISS:

 AP Physics
 AP Biology
 AP Calculus
 AP Chemistry
 AP Statistics
 AP World History
 AP Macroeconomics
 AP Microeconomics
 AP Human Geography
 AP Computer Science
 AP Comparative Government
 AP Language & Composition
 AP Chinese Language and Culture

Qingdao No.1 International is proud to be a Leader in Me School. The School follows the Leader in Me Stephen Covey Social and Emotional Learning Program.

References 

1)  Address in Chinese: 山东省青岛第一国际学校 青岛市松岭路232号 中国266101
2)  "Qingdao No. 1 International School of Shandong Province Official Website — Home Page". QISS.

External links 

 

Education in Qingdao
Educational institutions established in 2007
High schools in Shandong
International schools in China
2007 establishments in China